Lincoln Park United Methodist Church is a historic church at 3120 Pershing Street in Knoxville, Tennessee.

The church is a brick-veneered frame building that was built in 1926. The identity of its architect is not known, but the design suggests the work of Charles I. Barber. The entrance to the building is framed by columns with Doric capitals. Interior furnishings include oak pews, stained glass windows, a coffered ceiling over the sanctuary, and an altar balustrade.

The building was listed on the National Register of Historic Places in 2005.

References

United Methodist churches in Tennessee
Churches on the National Register of Historic Places in Tennessee
Neoclassical architecture in Tennessee
Churches completed in 1926
20th-century Methodist church buildings in the United States
Churches in Knoxville, Tennessee
National Register of Historic Places in Knoxville, Tennessee
Neoclassical church buildings in the United States